Wild Heather is a 1921 British drama film directed by Cecil Hepworth and starring Chrissie White, Gerald Ames, James Carew and George Dewhurst. It was based on the 1917 play Wild Heather by Dorothy Brandon.

Cast

Chrissie White as "Wild Heather" Boyd
G. H. Mulcaster as John O'Rourke
Gwynne Herbert as Mrs. Boyd
James Carew as Senator O'Rourke
Gerald Ames as Bevan Hutchinson
George Dewhurst as George O'Rourke
Hugh Clifton as Edward O'Rourke
James Annand as Professor Boyd
Eileen Dennes as Dolly
Marion Dyer as Trixie

References

1921 films
British silent feature films
Films directed by Cecil Hepworth
British black-and-white films
Hepworth Pictures films